Harry Lovell-Hewitt (born 25 January 1998 in Gloucester) is an English international judoka.  He has represented England at the Commonwealth Games and won a bronze medal and is a three time British champion.

Biography
Raised in Stroud, Lovell-Hewitt attended Rodborough primary school and then later Archway secondary school, splitting his free time between training for judo and rugby. He was taught judo at a young age by his coach Richard Neale. He is the great-grandson of William Lovell-Hewitt, a former international cricket player. Harry also represented Team GB at the youth Olympic festival in Tbilisi in 2015 where he placed 7th. Following on from that in his U21 age category he managed to secure four junior medals, including Gold at the Danish Open, silver in both Portugal and Lithuania. He won Gold at the 2018 Italian European Cup. Lovell-Hewitt won silver and bronze medals at the European Open in 2019 and 2021.

In 2022, he was selected for the 2022 Commonwealth Games in Birmingham where he competed in the men's 100 kg, winning the bronze medal after defeating Australian representative in the -100kg.

References

External links
 
 

1998 births
Living people
English male judoka
British male judoka
Judoka at the 2022 Commonwealth Games
Commonwealth Games competitors for England
Commonwealth Games bronze medallists for England
Commonwealth Games medallists in judo
20th-century English people
21st-century English people
Medallists at the 2022 Commonwealth Games